Picrorhiza scrophulariiflora belongs to family Scrophulariaceae. It is used heavily as a substitute for Picrorhiza kurroa and is considered non-threatened under CITES. It is similar to P. kurrooa but has leaves up to 6cm long and stems which are decumbent. Flowers of this plant are 1.5cm long, deep blue-purple with exserted styles and stamens.

References

Plantaginaceae